The 34th SS Volunteer Grenadier Division "Landstorm Nederland" ( was a division in the Waffen-SS of Nazi Germany during World War II. It was formed by converting the SS Volunteer Brigade Landstorm Nederland into a division. It comprised volunteers of Dutch background and  saw action on the Western Front, but its strength never reached more than a brigade.

Upon the Operation Market Garden landings in September 1944 the unit would come under the command of Hans Rauter in the newly formed Kampfgruppen Rauter along with the Wachbataillon Nordwest and a regiment of the Ordnungspolizei. Rauter was said to be proud of his Dutch 'Germanic SS'.

The unit fought various actions of the Eastern and Western fronts. It took part in fighting in the Netherlands, then Pomerania, and then on the Seelow heights. In the latter action, Panzerjagdbrigade "Dora", equipped with Jagdtigers was attached to the formation, and both were destroyed attempting counterattacks.

Commanders
 Martin Kohlroser (5 November 1944 – 8 May 1945)

See also
List of German divisions in World War II
List of Waffen-SS divisions
List of SS personnel

References

Footnotes

Bibliography
 Pierik, Perry - From Leningrad to Berlin: Dutch Volunteers in the German Waffen-SS

Dutch collaborators with Nazi Germany
Foreign volunteer units of the Waffen-SS
Military units and formations established in 1943
Military units and formations disestablished in 1945
34